Judith Basin County is a county in the U.S. state of Montana. As of the 2020 census, the population was 2,023. Its county seat is the town of Stanford.

History
Judith Basin County was formed of area taken from western Fergus and eastern Cascade counties on December 10, 1920. In 1895, Yogo sapphires were discovered at Yogo Gulch, about 15 miles southwest of Utica, which at the time was in Fergus County.

Geography

Adjacent counties

 Chouteau County – north
 Fergus County – east
 Wheatland County – south
 Meagher County – south
 Cascade County – west

National protected area
 Lewis and Clark National Forest (part)

City
 Hobson

Town
 Stanford (county seat)

Census-designated places

 Geyser
 Moccasin
 Raynesford
 Sapphire Ridge
 Surprise Creek Colony
 Utica
 Windham

Other unincorporated communities

 Arrow Creek
 Benchland
 Hughesville
 Kolin
 Lehigh
 Sapphire Village
 Sipple
 Spion Kop

 Utica

Former town
 Ubet

Politics
This small county strongly leans Republican; a Democrat has not won this county in a Presidential race since Lyndon Johnson's landslide win in 1964.

Demographics

2010 census
As of the 2010 census, there were 2,072 people, 924 households, and 600 families in the county. The racial makeup of the county was 98.3% white, 0.8% American Indian, 0.1% Asian, 0.1% from other races, and 0.7% from two or more races. Those of Hispanic or Latino origin made up 1.2% of the population. In terms of ancestry, 30.9% were German, 16.7% were English, 16.1% were Irish, 10.3% were Norwegian, 6.7% were Czech, 5.0% were Danish, and 1.7% were American.

Of the 924 households, 24.0% had children under the age of 18 living with them, 55.7% were married couples living together, 5.2% had a female householder with no husband present, 35.1% were non-families, and 30.3% of all households were made up of individuals. The average household size was 2.24 and the average family size was 2.80. The median age was 48.3 years.

The median income for a household in the county was $41,473 and the median income for a family was $54,479. Males had a median income of $36,295 versus $29,750 for females. The per capita income for the county was $24,029. About 6.4% of families and 9.9% of the population were below the poverty line, including 8.9% of those under age 18 and 9.0% of those age 65 or over.

2000 census
As of the 2000 census, there were 2,329 people, 951 households, and 661 families in the county. The population density was 1.25 per square mile (0.48/km2). There were 1,325 housing units at an average density of 0.70 per square mile (0.27/km2). The racial makeup of the county was 98.63% White, 0.04% Black or African American, 0.34% Native American, 0.09% Asian, 0.04% from other races, and 0.86% from two or more races. 0.56% of the population were Hispanic or Latino of any race. 27.1% were of German, 11.3% Norwegian, 10.0% Irish, 9.8% English and 8.7% American ancestry. 92.0% spoke English and 7.5% German as their first language. Many of the German-speaking residents of Judith Basin County are Hutterites.

There were 951 households, out of which 30.00% had children under the age of 18 living with them, 62.70% were married couples living together, 4.30% had a female householder with no husband present, and 30.40% were non-families. 27.50% of all households were made up of individuals, and 12.30% had someone living alone who was 65 years of age or older. The average household size was 2.45 and the average family size was 3.02.

The county population contained 26.80% under the age of 18, 4.60% from 18 to 24, 23.30% from 25 to 44, 28.20% from 45 to 64, and 17.20% who were 65 years of age or older. The median age was 42 years. For every 100 females there were 107.90 males. For every 100 females age 18 and over, there were 103.90 males.

The median income for a household in the county was $29,241, and the median income for a family was $34,243. Males had a median income of $21,789 versus $14,615 for females. The per capita income for the county was $14,291.  About 16.30% of families and 21.10% of the population were below the poverty line, including 30.60% of those under age 18 and 13.30% of those age 65 or over.

See also
 List of lakes in Judith Basin County, Montana
 List of mountains in Judith Basin County, Montana
 National Register of Historic Places listings in Judith Basin County, Montana

References

External links
 

 
Montana counties on the Missouri River
1920 establishments in Montana
Populated places established in 1920